Balakta (Balagta) is a rural locality (an ulus) in Okinsky District, Republic of Buryatia, Russia. The population was 241 as of 2010. There are 3 streets.

Geography 
Balakta is located 14 km southwest of Orlik (the district's administrative centre) by road. Orlik is the nearest rural locality.

References 

Rural localities in Okinsky District